Vũ Thư is a township and capital of Vũ Thư District, Thái Bình Province, Vietnam.

References

Populated places in Thái Bình province
District capitals in Vietnam
Townships in Vietnam